The 1965 Pittsburgh Pirates season was the 84th season of the Pittsburgh Pirates franchise; their 79th in the National League. The Pirates finished third in the league standings with a record of 90–72.

Regular season

Season standings

Record vs. opponents

Game log

|- bgcolor="ccffcc"
| 1 || April 12 || Giants || 1–0 (10) || Veale (1–0) || Marichal || — || 28,189 || 1–0
|- bgcolor="ccffcc"
| 2 || April 13 || Giants || 5–2 || Friend (1–0) || Sanford || McBean (1) || 4,444 || 2–0
|- bgcolor="ffbbbb"
| 3 || April 14 || Dodgers || 1–3 || Osteen || Gibbon (0–1) || — || 7,770 || 2–1
|- bgcolor="ccffcc"
| 4 || April 17 || Astros || 3–2 (10) || Face (1–0) || Owens || — || 6,129 || 3–1
|- bgcolor="ffbbbb"
| 5 || April 18 || Astros || 1–3 || Bruce || Law (0–1) || — ||  || 3–2
|- bgcolor="ccffcc"
| 6 || April 18 || Astros || 5–4 || McBean (1–0) || MacKenzie || — || 7,176 || 4–2
|- bgcolor="ccffcc"
| 7 || April 20 || @ Giants || 3–1 || Friend (2–0) || Bolin || McBean (2) || 37,784 || 5–2
|- bgcolor="ffbbbb"
| 8 || April 21 || @ Giants || 2–3 || Marichal || Gibbon (0–2) || — || 12,022 || 5–3
|- bgcolor="ffbbbb"
| 9 || April 23 || @ Astros || 3–4 (12) || Giusti || McBean (1–1) || — || 25,399 || 5–4
|- bgcolor="ffbbbb"
| 10 || April 24 || @ Astros || 0–5 || Farrell || Law (0–2) || — || 30,736 || 5–5
|- bgcolor="ffbbbb"
| 11 || April 25 || @ Astros || 4–5 (11) || Raymond || Face (1–1) || — || 19,116 || 5–6
|- bgcolor="ffbbbb"
| 12 || April 26 || @ Astros || 0–2 || Giusti || Friend (2–1) || — || 15,053 || 5–7
|- bgcolor="ffbbbb"
| 13 || April 27 || @ Dodgers || 4–5 || Reed || Gibbon (0–3) || Miller || 17,630 || 5–8
|- bgcolor="ccffcc"
| 14 || April 28 || @ Dodgers || 2–0 || Veale (2–0) || Osteen || — || 17,464 || 6–8
|- bgcolor="ffbbbb"
| 15 || April 30 || @ Cardinals || 2–3 || Washburn || Law (0–3) || — || 20,401 || 6–9
|-

|- bgcolor="ffbbbb"
| 16 || May 1 || @ Cardinals || 2–3 || Stallard || Cardwell (0–1) || — || 9,689 || 6–10
|- bgcolor="ffbbbb"
| 17 || May 2 || @ Cardinals || 5–9 || Gibson || Friend (2–2) || Taylor ||  || 6–11
|- bgcolor="ffbbbb"
| 18 || May 2 || @ Cardinals || 4–5 || Washburn || McBean (1–2) || — || 23,630 || 6–12
|- bgcolor="ccffcc"
| 19 || May 4 || @ Cubs || 6–3 || McBean (2–2) || Broglio || — || 1,527 || 7–12
|- bgcolor="ffbbbb"
| 20 || May 5 || @ Cubs || 1–3 || Buhl || Law (0–4) || — || 2,093 || 7–13
|- bgcolor="ffbbbb"
| 21 || May 6 || @ Cubs || 3–5 || Jackson || Schwall (0–1) || Abernathy || 1,471 || 7–14
|- bgcolor="ccffcc"
| 22 || May 7 || Reds || 5–4 || Sisk (1–0) || Craig || — || 9,052 || 8–14
|- bgcolor="ffbbbb"
| 23 || May 8 || Reds || 1–10 || Maloney || Veale (2–1) || — || 5,790 || 8–15
|- bgcolor="ffbbbb"
| 24 || May 9 || Reds || 3–5 || Arrigo || McBean (2–3) || McCool || 6,858 || 8–16
|- bgcolor="ccffcc"
| 25 || May 11 || Braves || 4–3 || Cardwell (1–1) || Blasingame || McBean (3) || 4,694 || 9–16
|- bgcolor="ffbbbb"
| 26 || May 12 || Braves || 4–5 || Lemaster || Butters (0–1) || O'Dell || 4,464 || 9–17
|- bgcolor="ffbbbb"
| 27 || May 13 || Braves || 4–5 || Niekro || Schwall (0–2) || — || 4,165 || 9–18
|- bgcolor="ffbbbb"
| 28 || May 14 || Cardinals || 7–8 || Schultz || McBean (2–4) || Purkey || 9,986 || 9–19
|- bgcolor="ffbbbb"
| 29 || May 15 || Cardinals || 1–5 || Stallard || Law (0–5) || — || 5,148 || 9–20
|- bgcolor="ffbbbb"
| 30 || May 16 || Cardinals || 3–6 || Gibson || Cardwell (1–2) || — ||  || 9–21
|- bgcolor="ffbbbb"
| 31 || May 16 || Cardinals || 1–5 || Washburn || Veale (2–2) || Purkey || 11,081 || 9–22
|- bgcolor="ffbbbb"
| 32 || May 19 || @ Reds || 1–3 || McCool || Gibbon (0–4) || — || 6,743 || 9–23
|- bgcolor="ffbbbb"
| 33 || May 20 || @ Reds || 3–11 || Ellis || Friend (2–3) || — || 5,209 || 9–24
|- bgcolor="ccffcc"
| 34 || May 21 || @ Braves || 6–1 || Law (1–5) || Lemaster || McBean (4) || 2,679 || 10–24
|- bgcolor="ccffcc"
| 35 || May 22 || @ Braves || 9–4 || Sisk (2–0) || Cloninger || McBean (5) || 2,662 || 11–24
|- bgcolor="ccffcc"
| 36 || May 23 || @ Braves || 10–1 || Veale (3–2) || Sadowski || — || 2,053 || 12–24
|- bgcolor="ccffcc"
| 37 || May 24 || Cubs || 6–4 || Schwall (1–2) || Broglio || McBean (6) || 5,360 || 13–24
|- bgcolor="ccffcc"
| 38 || May 25 || Cubs || 7–6 (12) || Carpin (1–0) || Warner || — || 6,403 || 14–24
|- bgcolor="ccffcc"
| 39 || May 26 || @ Phillies || 5–3 || Sisk (3–0) || Mahaffey || — || 10,212 || 15–24
|- bgcolor="ccffcc"
| 40 || May 28 || @ Mets || 6–1 || Veale (4–2) || Spahn || — || 32,011 || 16–24
|- bgcolor="ccffcc"
| 41 || May 29 || @ Mets || 7–4 || Schwall (2–2) || Lary || McBean (7) || 11,297 || 17–24
|- bgcolor="ccffcc"
| 42 || May 30 || @ Mets || 9–1 || Friend (3–3) || Jackson || — ||  || 18–24
|- bgcolor="ccffcc"
| 43 || May 30 || @ Mets || 12–0 || Law (2–5) || Parsons || — || 41,552 || 19–24
|- bgcolor="ccffcc"
| 44 || May 31 || Phillies || 5–2 || Cardwell (2–2) || Short || McBean (8) || 16,366 || 20–24
|-

|- bgcolor="ccffcc"
| 45 || June 1 || Phillies || 4–0 || Veale (5–2) || Mahaffey || — || 10,478 || 21–24
|- bgcolor="ffbbbb"
| 46 || June 3 || Mets || 6–8 || Cisco || Gibbon (0–5) || Parsons || 9,169 || 21–25
|- bgcolor="ffbbbb"
| 47 || June 4 || Mets || 1–2 || Fisher || Friend (3–4) || — || 11,026 || 21–26
|- bgcolor="ccffcc"
| 48 || June 5 || Mets || 9–0 || Law (3–5) || Kroll || — || 6,581 || 22–26
|- bgcolor="ccffcc"
| 49 || June 6 || Mets || 5–3 || Cardwell (3–2) || Jackson || — ||  || 23–26
|- bgcolor="ccffcc"
| 50 || June 6 || Mets || 3–0 || Veale (6–2) || Spahn || — || 16,387 || 24–26
|- bgcolor="ccffcc"
| 51 || June 8 || Astros || 7–6 (11) || Gibbon (1–5) || Woodeshick || — || 8,084 || 25–26
|- bgcolor="ccffcc"
| 52 || June 9 || Astros || 11–3 || Law (4–5) || Nottebart || — || 9,412 || 26–26
|- bgcolor="ccffcc"
| 53 || June 10 || Astros || 4–2 || Veale (7–2) || Bruce || — || 9,839 || 27–26
|- bgcolor="ccffcc"
| 54 || June 11 || Giants || 5–3 || Cardwell (4–2) || Hands || Carpin (1) || 24,708 || 28–26
|- bgcolor="ffbbbb"
| 55 || June 12 || Giants || 0–4 || Shaw || Friend (3–5) || Linzy || 12,213 || 28–27
|- bgcolor="ccffcc"
| 56 || June 13 || Giants || 2–1 || Law (5–5) || Perry || — || 20,091 || 29–27
|- bgcolor="ffbbbb"
| 57 || June 14 || @ Cardinals || 2–5 || Taylor || Veale (7–3) || — || 5,265 || 29–28
|- bgcolor="ccffcc"
| 58 || June 15 || @ Cardinals || 10–6 || Carpin (2–0) || Stallard || McBean (9) || 10,428 || 30–28
|- bgcolor="ccffcc"
| 59 || June 16 || @ Cardinals || 10–9 || Schwall (3–2) || Schultz || — || 10,480 || 31–28
|- bgcolor="ccffcc"
| 60 || June 17 || @ Cardinals || 4–1 || Law (6–5) || Gibson || — || 11,905 || 32–28
|- bgcolor="ffbbbb"
| 61 || June 18 || @ Astros || 1–5 || Bruce || Veale (7–4) || — || 24,286 || 32–29
|- bgcolor="ccffcc"
| 62 || June 19 || @ Astros || 5–3 (11) || Gibbon (2–5) || Nottebart || Carpin (2) || 27,785 || 33–29
|- bgcolor="ffbbbb"
| 63 || June 20 || @ Giants || 3–4 (15) || Herbel || McBean (2–5) || — ||  || 33–30
|- bgcolor="ffbbbb"
| 64 || June 20 || @ Giants || 3–7 || Bolin || Schwall (3–3) || Linzy || 39,757 || 33–31
|- bgcolor="ccffcc"
| 65 || June 22 || @ Giants || 6–0 || Law (7–5) || Perry || — || 10,537 || 34–31
|- bgcolor="ffbbbb"
| 66 || June 23 || @ Giants || 1–6 || Herbel || Veale (7–5) || Linzy || 8,209 || 34–32
|- bgcolor="ccffcc"
| 67 || June 24 || @ Dodgers || 13–3 || Cardwell (5–2) || Drysdale || — || 28,867 || 35–32
|- bgcolor="ffbbbb"
| 68 || June 25 || @ Dodgers || 1–4 || Koufax || Friend (3–6) || — || 32,060 || 35–33
|- bgcolor="ccffcc"
| 69 || June 26 || @ Dodgers || 6–1 || Law (8–5) || Osteen || — || 21,769 || 36–33
|- bgcolor="ccffcc"
| 70 || June 27 || @ Dodgers || 10–2 || Veale (8–5) || Podres || — || 33,161 || 37–33
|- bgcolor="ccffcc"
| 71 || June 28 || Reds || 5–4 || Cardwell (6–2) || O'Toole || McBean (10) || 15,302 || 38–33
|- bgcolor="ccffcc"
| 72 || June 29 || Reds || 2–1 (16) || Schwall (4–3) || McCool || — ||  || 39–33
|- bgcolor="ffbbbb"
| 73 || June 29 || Reds || 5–7 || Nuxhall || Gibbon (2–6) || Craig || 28,589 || 39–34
|- bgcolor="ffbbbb"
| 74 || June 30 || Cardinals || 1–7 || Washburn || Law (8–6) || Woodeshick || 15,369 || 39–35
|-

|- bgcolor="ffbbbb"
| 75 || July 1 || Cardinals || 6–7 || Woodeshick || Gibbon (2–7) || Sadecki || 11,920 || 39–36
|- bgcolor="ccffcc"
| 76 || July 2 || Braves || 8–3 || Cardwell (7–2) || Cloninger || Schwall (1) || 12,352 || 40–36
|- bgcolor="ccffcc"
| 77 || July 3 || Braves || 9–5 || Friend (4–6) || Sadowski || Carpin (3) || 9,460 || 41–36
|- bgcolor="ffbbbb"
| 78 || July 4 || Braves || 2–5 || Fischer || Law (8–7) || — || 16,145 || 41–37
|- bgcolor="ffbbbb"
| 79 || July 5 || @ Phillies || 1–3 || Bunning || Veale (8–6) || — ||  || 41–38
|- bgcolor="ffbbbb"
| 80 || July 5 || @ Phillies || 2–6 || Roebuck || Wood (0–1) || Wagner || 25,330 || 41–39
|- bgcolor="ccffcc"
| 81 || July 6 || @ Phillies || 8–4 || Cardwell (8–2) || Culp || — || 17,357 || 42–39
|- bgcolor="ffbbbb"
| 82 || July 7 || @ Phillies || 0–1 || Short || Friend (4–7) || — || 16,632 || 42–40
|- bgcolor="ffbbbb"
| 83 || July 8 || Dodgers || 4–9 || Reed || Law (8–8) || — || 22,247 || 42–41
|- bgcolor="ccffcc"
| 84 || July 9 || Dodgers || 4–1 || Veale (9–6) || Willhite || — || 16,284 || 43–41
|- bgcolor="ffbbbb"
| 85 || July 10 || Dodgers || 4–8 || Drysdale || Cardwell (8–3) || Perranoski || 14,880 || 43–42
|- bgcolor="ffbbbb"
| 86 || July 11 || Dodgers || 2–4 || Koufax || Gibbon (2–8) || — ||  || 43–43
|- bgcolor="ccffcc"
| 87 || July 11 || Dodgers || 4–3 (10) || Carpin (3–0) || Miller || — || 37,631 || 44–43
|- bgcolor="ffbbbb"
| 88 || July 15 || @ Braves || 6–9 || Johnson || Law (8–9) || Osinski || 5,180 || 44–44
|- bgcolor="ffbbbb"
| 89 || July 16 || @ Braves || 2–12 || Blasingame || Veale (9–7) || — || 6,090 || 44–45
|- bgcolor="ffbbbb"
| 90 || July 17 || @ Braves || 5–6 || O'Dell || Carpin (3–1) || — || 4,518 || 44–46
|- bgcolor="ccffcc"
| 91 || July 18 || @ Reds || 6–5 || Schwall (5–3) || Craig || — ||  || 45–46
|- bgcolor="ffbbbb"
| 92 || July 18 || @ Reds || 4–8 || Jay || Gibbon (2–9) || McCool || 25,637 || 45–47
|- bgcolor="ccffcc"
| 93 || July 19 || @ Reds || 3–1 || Law (9–9) || Nuxhall || — || 11,096 || 46–47
|- bgcolor="ccffcc"
| 94 || July 20 || @ Reds || 8–6 || Veale (10–7) || Ellis || McBean (11) || 9,669 || 47–47
|- bgcolor="ffbbbb"
| 95 || July 21 || Mets || 0–1 || Jackson || Cardwell (8–4) || — || 22,670 || 47–48
|- bgcolor="ccffcc"
| 96 || July 23 || @ Cubs || 6–0 || Friend (5–7) || Ellsworth || — || 5,288 || 48–48
|- bgcolor="ccffcc"
| 97 || July 24 || @ Cubs || 8–5 || Law (10–9) || Jackson || McBean (12) || 9,578 || 49–48
|- bgcolor="ccffcc"
| 98 || July 25 || @ Cubs || 3–2 (13) || Law (11–9) || McDaniel || — ||  || 50–48
|- bgcolor="ffbbbb"
| 99 || July 25 || @ Cubs || 0–5 || Faul || Cardwell (8–5) || — || 20,777 || 50–49
|- bgcolor="ffbbbb"
| 100 || July 27 || Phillies || 1–3 || Wagner || Friend (5–8) || Baldschun ||  || 50–50
|- bgcolor="ccffcc"
| 101 || July 27 || Phillies || 3–2 (10) || Schwall (6–3) || Wagner || — || 21,832 || 51–50
|- bgcolor="ffbbbb"
| 102 || July 28 || Phillies || 0–1 (14) || Baldschun || Schwall (6–4) || — || 13,207 || 51–51
|- bgcolor="ffbbbb"
| 103 || July 29 || Phillies || 0–5 || Culp || Veale (10–8) || — || 10,160 || 51–52
|- bgcolor="ccffcc"
| 104 || July 30 || Cubs || 3–1 || Cardwell (9–5) || Broglio || — || 11,382 || 52–52
|- bgcolor="ffbbbb"
| 105 || July 31 || Cubs || 6–7 || Buhl || Sisk (3–1) || Abernathy || 7,431 || 52–53
|-

|- bgcolor="ccffcc"
| 106 || August 1 || Cubs || 8–2 || McBean (3–5) || Ellsworth || Schwall (2) ||  || 53–53
|- bgcolor="ccffcc"
| 107 || August 1 || Cubs || 3–1 || Gibbon (3–9) || Jackson || Schwall (3) || 14,741 || 54–53
|- bgcolor="ccffcc"
| 108 || August 3 || @ Mets || 7–0 || Law (12–9) || Cisco || — || 24,597 || 55–53
|- bgcolor="ccffcc"
| 109 || August 4 || @ Mets || 3–0 || Veale (11–8) || Fisher || Schwall (4) || 20,703 || 56–53
|- bgcolor="ccffcc"
| 110 || August 5 || @ Mets || 11–3 || Cardwell (10–5) || Jackson || — || 19,374 || 57–53
|- bgcolor="ffbbbb"
| 111 || August 6 || @ Phillies || 0–4 || Bunning || Friend (5–9) || — || 22,155 || 57–54
|- bgcolor="ccffcc"
| 112 || August 7 || @ Phillies || 4–3 || McBean (4–5) || Culp || — || 8,204 || 58–54
|- bgcolor="ccffcc"
| 113 || August 8 || @ Phillies || 7–1 || Veale (12–8) || Short || — ||  || 59–54
|- bgcolor="ffbbbb"
| 114 || August 8 || @ Phillies || 2–5 || Herbert || Sisk (3–2) || — || 29,260 || 59–55
|- bgcolor="ffbbbb"
| 115 || August 10 || @ Giants || 3–4 || Marichal || Cardwell (10–6) || — || 14,457 || 59–56
|- bgcolor="ffbbbb"
| 116 || August 12 || @ Giants || 3–4 || Linzy || Schwall (6–5) || — ||  || 59–57
|- bgcolor="ccffcc"
| 117 || August 12 || @ Giants || 5–2 || Law (13–9) || Perry || — || 20,435 || 60–57
|- bgcolor="ffbbbb"
| 118 || August 13 || @ Dodgers || 1–3 || Osteen || Veale (12–9) || — || 32,551 || 60–58
|- bgcolor="ffbbbb"
| 119 || August 14 || @ Dodgers || 0–1 (10) || Koufax || Cardwell (10–7) || — || 29,237 || 60–59
|- bgcolor="ccffcc"
| 120 || August 15 || @ Dodgers || 4–2 || Sisk (4–2) || Drysdale || McBean (13) || 25,175 || 61–59
|- bgcolor="ffbbbb"
| 121 || August 16 || @ Astros || 0–3 || Roberts || Friend (5–10) || — || 26,549 || 61–60
|- bgcolor="ccffcc"
| 122 || August 17 || @ Astros || 8–6 || Law (14–9) || Farrell || McBean (14) || 24,863 || 62–60
|- bgcolor="ccffcc"
| 123 || August 18 || @ Astros || 8–7 || Veale (13–9) || Nottebart || McBean (15) || 30,470 || 63–60
|- bgcolor="ffbbbb"
| 124 || August 20 || Braves || 3–4 || Blasingame || Cardwell (10–8) || — || 18,653 || 63–61
|- bgcolor="ccffcc"
| 125 || August 21 || Braves || 3–0 || Friend (6–10) || Lemaster || — || 10,259 || 64–61
|- bgcolor="ccffcc"
| 126 || August 22 || Braves || 5–4 (11) || Schwall (7–5) || Osinski || — || 14,112 || 65–61
|- bgcolor="ccffcc"
| 127 || August 23 || Giants || 6–2 || Law (15–9) || Spahn || — || 15,016 || 66–61
|- bgcolor="ccffcc"
| 128 || August 24 || Giants || 5–2 || Cardwell (11–8) || Shaw || — || 15,497 || 67–61
|- bgcolor="ffffff"
| 129 || August 25 || Giants || 3–3 ||  ||  || — || 13,348 || 67–61
|- bgcolor="ccffcc"
| 130 || August 26 || Giants || 8–0 || Veale (14–9) || Herbel || — ||  || 68–61
|- bgcolor="ccffcc"
| 131 || August 26 || Giants || 6–5 || Sisk (5–2) || Perry || McBean (16) || 18,893 || 69–61
|- bgcolor="ccffcc"
| 132 || August 27 || Astros || 10–9 (11) || McBean (5–5) || Cuellar || — || 12,917 || 70–61
|- bgcolor="ffbbbb"
| 133 || August 28 || Astros || 6–9 || Dierker || Schwall (7–6) || Giusti || 7,051 || 70–62
|- bgcolor="ccffcc"
| 134 || August 29 || Astros || 4–2 || Wood (1–1) || Nottebart || Gibbon (1) || 30,002 || 71–62
|-

|- bgcolor="ccffcc"
| 135 || September 1 || Dodgers || 3–2 (11) || Gibbon (4–9) || Koufax || — ||  || 72–62
|- bgcolor="ccffcc"
| 136 || September 1 || Dodgers || 2–1 || Law (16–9) || Drysdale || — || 26,394 || 73–62
|- bgcolor="ffbbbb"
| 137 || September 2 || Dodgers || 1–7 || Osteen || Veale (14–10) || Perranoski || 29,200 || 73–63
|- bgcolor="ffbbbb"
| 138 || September 3 || @ Braves || 3–4 || Johnson || Cardwell (11–9) || Osinski || 5,349 || 73–64
|- bgcolor="ffbbbb"
| 139 || September 4 || @ Braves || 3–8 (8) || Cloninger || Friend (6–11) || O'Dell || 2,471 || 73–65
|- bgcolor="ccffcc"
| 140 || September 5 || @ Braves || 2–1 || Sisk (6–2) || Sadowski || McBean (17) || 20,409 || 74–65
|- bgcolor="ccffcc"
| 141 || September 6 || @ Reds || 3–1 || Veale (15–10) || Jay || — ||  || 75–65
|- bgcolor="ccffcc"
| 142 || September 6 || @ Reds || 4–2 || McBean (6–5) || Maloney || — || 16,323 || 76–65
|- bgcolor="ffbbbb"
| 143 || September 7 || @ Reds || 0–5 || Ellis || Cardwell (11–10) || — || 7,153 || 76–66
|- bgcolor="ccffcc"
| 144 || September 8 || @ Cardinals || 2–1 || Friend (7–11) || Sadecki || — || 9,714 || 77–66
|- bgcolor="ccffcc"
| 145 || September 10 || Reds || 7–0 || Veale (16–10) || Jay || — || 20,694 || 78–66
|- bgcolor="ffbbbb"
| 146 || September 11 || Reds || 2–3 || Maloney || Sisk (6–3) || — || 9,570 || 78–67
|- bgcolor="ccffcc"
| 147 || September 13 || Reds || 8–4 || Law (17–9) || Ellis || — || 1,299 || 79–67
|- bgcolor="ffbbbb"
| 148 || September 14 || Cardinals || 2–3 || Gibson || Friend (7–12) || Woodeshick || 8,224 || 79–68
|- bgcolor="ffbbbb"
| 149 || September 15 || Cardinals || 3–7 || Sadecki || Veale (16–11) || Briles || 6,725 || 79–69
|- bgcolor="ffbbbb"
| 150 || September 16 || Cardinals || 1–2 || Stallard || McBean (6–6) || Woodeshick || 4,788 || 79–70
|- bgcolor="ccffcc"
| 151 || September 17 || Phillies || 4–0 || Cardwell (12–10) || Culp || — || 8,987 || 80–70
|- bgcolor="ccffcc"
| 152 || September 18 || Phillies || 4–3 || Face (2–1) || Steevens || — || 5,313 || 81–70
|- bgcolor="ccffcc"
| 153 || September 19 || Phillies || 1–0 (10) || Veale (17–11) || Baldschun || — || 10,026 || 82–70
|- bgcolor="ccffcc"
| 154 || September 20 || Mets || 10–0 || Sisk (7–3) || Fisher || — || 3,892 || 83–70
|- bgcolor="ccffcc"
| 155 || September 21 || Mets || 6–5 || Face (3–1) || Eilers || — || 4,660 || 84–70
|- bgcolor="ccffcc"
| 156 || September 22 || Mets || 6–2 || Friend (8–12) || McGraw || — || 4,964 || 85–70
|- bgcolor="ffbbbb"
| 157 || September 25 || @ Cubs || 3–6 || Hendley || Veale (17–12) || Abernathy || 2,903 || 85–71
|- bgcolor="ccffcc"
| 158 || September 26 || @ Cubs || 5–3 (10) || Schwall (8–6) || Abernathy || — || 2,097 || 86–71
|- bgcolor="ffbbbb"
| 159 || September 28 || @ Mets || 0–1 (12) || Sutherland || Face (3–2) || — || 6,995 || 86–72
|- bgcolor="ccffcc"
| 160 || September 29 || @ Mets || 4–2 || Schwall (9–6) || Selma || McBean (18) || 2,807 || 87–72
|-

|- bgcolor="ccffcc"
| 161 || October 1 || Cubs || 2–1 || Face (4–2) || Ellsworth || — || 3,441 || 88–72
|- bgcolor="ccffcc"
| 162 || October 2 || Cubs || 3–0 || Cardwell (13–10) || Jackson || — || 3,626 || 89–72
|- bgcolor="ccffcc"
| 163 || October 3 || Cubs || 6–3 || Face (5–2) || Abernathy || McBean (19) || 26,527 || 90–72
|-

|-
| Legend:       = Win       = Loss       = TieBold = Pirates team member

Opening Day lineup

Notable transactions 
 June 8, 1965: Tom Dettore was drafted by the Pirates in the 26th round of the 1965 Major League Baseball draft, but did not sign.
 June 20, 1965: Don Money was signed as an amateur free agent by the Pirates.
 July 6, 1965: Woodie Fryman was signed as an amateur free agent by the Pirates.

Roster

Statistics
Batting
Note: G = Games played; AB = At bats; H = Hits; Avg. = Batting average; HR = Home runs; RBI = Runs batted in

Pitching
Note: G = Games pitched; IP = Innings pitched; W = Wins; L = Losses; ERA = Earned run average; SO = Strikeouts

Farm system 

LEAGUE CHAMPIONS: Salem

Notes

References 
 1965 Pittsburgh Pirates at Baseball Reference
 1965 Pittsburgh Pirates at Baseball Almanac

Pittsburgh Pirates seasons
Pittsburgh Pirates season
Pittsburg